ISD-AJD Gol Częstochowa is a Polish women's football club from Częstochowa.

Initial seasons

The team played in the highest league in 2004-05 but didn't qualify for the then new founded Ekstraliga Kobiet. Though in the next season the second division was won without a loss and promotion to the Ekstraliga was achieved.

After three seasons in the Ekstraliga Kobiet, the club was relegated and now plays in the I Liga, the 2nd division.

Its greatest success was the vice-championship in 2006-07 and the following participation in the 2007–08 UEFA Women's Cup first qualifying round.

In 2008, the team played under the name AZS Częstochowa.

References

External links 

Women's football clubs in Poland
Women's futsal clubs in Poland
Sport in Częstochowa
Football clubs in Silesian Voivodeship
Association football clubs established in 1996
1996 establishments in Poland